Callimachus may refer to:

People
 Callimachus (polemarch), one of the commanders of the Athenian army at the Battle of Marathon in 490 BC
 Callimachus (sculptor) (5th century BC)
 Callimachus, 3rd century BC poet and scholar
 , Ptolemaic official of the 1st century BC
 Filippo Buonaccorsi (1437–1496), called "Callimachus," Italian humanist

Literature
 Callimachus (play), a 10th-century play by Hrotsvitha

See also
 Callimachi family